Henry Evans (c. 1832 – 17 June 1905) was a conjurer, ventriloquist and humorist, born in Kennington, South London, who used the stage name Evanion. Performances in front of members of the British Royal Family, including Queen Victoria at Sandringham, and the Prince of Wales (later Edward VII) and Princess Alexandra at Marlborough House, enabled him to use the name "The Royal Conjuror" in his publicity.

Career
Evans had a successful career of over fifty years from 1849, performing in theatres and music halls in London and the English provinces and at private functions. He was an inveterate collector who created a collection of around 5000 items of ephemera relating to popular Victorian entertainment and daily life that is now in the British Library as The Evanion Collection. The collection was purchased by the British Museum Library in 1895. He was acquainted with Harry Houdini who purchased a quantity of items related to magic and illusions from Evans in 1904. According to Houdini, Evans spent every spare hour at the British Museum collecting information about the history of magic.

Death
Evans died, impoverished, of cancer of the throat at Lambeth Infirmary on 17 June 1905. He was survived by his wife who died not long afterwards.

See also
Evanion Collection

References

Further reading
"The Evanion Collection" by E. Harland in The British Library Journal Vol. 13, No. 1 (Spring 1987), pp. 64–70.

External links
Drawing of Evanion
Evanion at illusionwiki.com
Evanion the Royal conjuror plays with fire
French entertainment in the Evanion collection: from Robert-Houdin to La Foire du Trône

1832 births
1905 deaths
English humorists
English magicians
Harry Houdini
Historians of magic
People from Kennington
Ventriloquists
Victorian era